The Facility for Rare Isotopes Beams (FRIB) is a scientific user facility for nuclear science, funded by the U.S. Department of Energy Office of Science (DOE-SC), Michigan State University (MSU), and the State of Michigan. Michigan State University contributed an additional $212 million in various ways, including the land.  MSU established and operates FRIB as a user facility for the Office of Nuclear Physics in the U.S. Department of Energy Office of Science. At FRIB, scientists research the properties of rare isotopes to advance knowledge in the areas of nuclear physics, nuclear astrophysics, fundamental interactions of nuclei, and real-world applications of rare isotopes. Construction of the FRIB conventional facilities began in spring 2014 and was completed in 2017. Technical construction started in the fall of 2014 and was completed in January 2022. The total project cost was $730M with project completion in June 2022.

FRIB will provide researchers with the technical capabilities to study the properties of rare isotopes (that is, short-lived atomic nuclei not normally found on Earth). Real-world applications of the research include materials science, nuclear medicine, and the fundamental understanding of nuclear material important to nuclear weapons stockpile stewardship. More than 20 working groups specializing in experimental equipment and scientific topics have been organized through the FRIB Users Organization.

The FRIB will be capable of expanding the known Chart of the Nuclides from some approximately 3000 identified isotopes to over 6000 potentially identifiable isotopes.  It will accelerate beams of known isotopes through a matrix which will disrupt the nuclei, forming a variety of unusual isotopes of short half-life.  These will be 'filtered' by directing away the wrong charge/mass isotopes by magnetic field, leaving a small beam of the desired novel isotope for study.  Such beam can also target other known isotopes, fusing with the target, to create still further  unknown isotopes, for further study.  This will allow expansion of the Chart of the Nuclides towards its outer sides, the so-called Nuclear drip line.  It will also allow expansion of the Chart towards heavier isotopes, towards the Island of stability and beyond.

The establishment of a Facility for Rare Isotope Beams (FRIB) is the first recommendation in the 2012 National Academies Decadal Study of Nuclear Physics: Nuclear Physics: Exploring the Heart of the Matter. The priority for completion is listed in the 2015 Long Range Plan for Nuclear Science: Implementing Reaching for the Horizon by the DOE/NSF Nuclear Science Advisory Committee.

The facility has a robust Health Physics program under the umbrella of the university's Environmental Health and Safety department.

Developments

On December 11, 2008, the DOE-SC announced the selection of Michigan State University to design and establish FRIB.

The project earned Critical Decision 1 (CD-1) approval in September 2010 which established a preferred alternative and the associated established cost and schedule ranges.

On August 1, 2013, DOE-SC approved the project baseline (CD-2) and the start of civil construction (CD-3a), pending a notice to proceed. Civil construction could not start under the continuing appropriations resolution, which disallowed new construction starts.

On February 25, 2014, the board of the Michigan Strategic Fund met at Michigan State University and approved nearly $91 million to support the construction of FRIB.

The FRIB marked the official start of civil construction with a groundbreaking ceremony March 17, 2014. In attendance were representatives from the Michigan delegation, State of Michigan, Michigan State University, and the U.S. Department of Energy Office of Science. Technical construction started in October 2014, following a CD-3b approval by DOE-SC.

In March 2017, FRIB achieved beneficial occupancy of civil construction, and technical installation activities escalated as a result.

In February 2019, FRIB accelerated beams through the first 15 (of 46 total) cryomodules to 10 percent of FRIB's final beam energy. In August 2019, the radio-frequency quadrupole (RFQ) was conditioned above 100 kW, the CW power needed to achieve the FRIB mission goal of accelerating uranium beams. The RFQ prepares the beam for further acceleration in the linac.

Construction on two MSU-funded building additions was substantially completed in January 2020. The Cryogenic Assembly Building will be used for cryomodule maintenance and to perform cryogenic-engineering research. The High Rigidity Spectrometer and Isotope Harvesting Vault will house isotope-harvesting research equipment and provide space for experiments.

In March 2020, FRIB accelerated an argon-36 beam through 37 of 46 superconducting cryomodules to 204 MeV/nucleon or 57 percent of the speed of light.

In September 2020, DOE designated FRIB as a DOE-SC User Facility. U.S. Secretary of Energy Dan Brouillette announced the designation at a special ceremony held outdoors at MSU, under a tent adjacent to FRIB.

On February 24, 2021, the FRIB announced that 82 proposals requesting 9,784 hours of beam time and six letters of intent were submitted, covering 16 of the 17 National Academies benchmarks for FRIB, in response to their first call for proposals.  These proposals represent FRIB's international user community of more than 1,500 scientists. Respondents include 597 individual scientists, 354 of whom are from the United States.  They represent 130 institutions in 30 countries and 26 U.S. states.

On January 25, 2022, the FRIB project team delivered the first heavy-ion beam to the focal plane of the FRIB fragment separator, marking technical completion of the FRIB project.

On February 1–2, 2022, a review by the DOE-SC Office of Project Assessment reviewed FRIB's readiness for project completion and recommended that FRIB is ready for Critical Decision 4 (Approve Project Completion).

Michigan State University announced a ribbon-cutting ceremony for May 2, 2022.

On June 22, 2022 the first experiment at FRIB, which studied the beta-decay of calcium-48 fragments that are so unstable that they only exist for mere fractions of a second, concluded successfully.  FRIB’s first scientific user experiment had participation from Argonne National Laboratory, Brookhaven National Laboratory, Florida State University, FRIB, Lawrence Berkeley National Laboratory, Lawrence Livermore National Laboratory, Louisiana State University, Los Alamos National Laboratory, Mississippi State University, Oak Ridge National Laboratory, and the University of Tennessee Knoxville.

On November 14, 2022 its first experiment resulted in its first publication in Physical Review Letters

Notes

See also 

Radioactive Isotope Beam Factory
Facility for Antiproton and Ion Research
Grand Accélérateur National d'Ions Lourds
On-Line Isotope Mass Separator
Rare Isotope Science Project

References

 Archived from the original on March 15, 2016.

External links
Facility for Rare Isotope Beams
FRIB Users Organization

Particle accelerators
Isotopes
Nuclear chemistry
Nuclear physics
Michigan State University
Michigan State University campus